Rockdale is an extinct town in the northwest United States, in King County, Washington. The GNIS classifies it as a populated place.

A post office called "Rockdale" was established  in 1912, and remained in operation until 1915. The community in the Cascade Range was named for the abundance of rock near the original town site. Just south of Snoqualmie Pass, it was at the west portal of the Snoqualmie Tunnel, constructed by the Chicago, Milwaukee, St. Paul and Pacific Railroad (The Milwaukee Road) from 1912 to 1914.

The tunnel and right-of-way is now a rail trail, part of Iron Horse State Park.

References

47.392,-121.455
Ghost towns in Washington (state)
Geography of King County, Washington